Rocco Reginald Jansen (born 21 July 1986) is a former South African rugby union player. His regular playing position is Wing. He most recently represented Griquas in the Currie Cup. He has previously played for the Blue Bulls.

He retired at the end of the 2015 season to take up a role in the business sector.

References

External links

itsrugby.co.uk profile

Living people
1986 births
South African rugby union players
Cheetahs (rugby union) players
People from Queenstown, South Africa
Rugby union wings
North-West University alumni
Griquas (rugby union) players
Eastern Province Elephants players
Blue Bulls players
Rugby union players from the Eastern Cape
Alumni of Queen's College Boys' High School